This is an incomplete list of beaches in Israel broken down by bodies of water they are on. These beaches are known for their clear blue water along 4 distinct bodies of water around Israel. In total there are 137 beaches in Israel.

Red Sea

List of beaches along the Red Sea, also known in Israel as the Reed Sea, located in southern Israel:

 9Beach – Opened in Eilat in 2009 is located near a number of bars and the mall.
 Bar Beach – Located in Eilat is a small beach located near a reef.
 Club Med Beach – Located in southern Eilat is open to hotel guests and the public, and offers basketball and tennis courts, volleyball, archery targets, wind surfing, snorkeling and a dance floor.
 Coral Beach  – Located in the Coral Beach Nature Reserve in Eilat
 Dan Hotel Beach – Is a private beach in northern Eilat, owned privately by Dan Hotels for the guests.
 Dekel Beach – Located in Eilat is best known for its Friday night Kabbalat Shabbat service.
 Dolphin Reef Beach – Located in Eilat near the Dolphin Reef
 Electric Company Beach – Located in Eilat offers marine equipment rentals.
 Golden Beach – Known locally as Hof HaZahav is located in Eilat, right near the Dan Hotel Beach.
 HaSh'hafim Beach – Translated as Seagulls Beach enjoy clear blue water due to the lack of boats being allowed in the nearby water.
 Isrotel Princess Hotel Beach – Located in Eilat near Coral Reef with snorkel equipment available for rent.
 Kisuski Beach – Located in Eilat is popular with those who wish to rent water sports equipment and snorkels.
 Migdalor Beach – Located in Eilat right near the Ben-Gurion University of the Negev campus
 Moriah Beach – Located in Eilat in front of the Leonardo Plaza Hotel.
 Royal Beach Hotel Beach – Owned by the Royal Beach Hotel, however is open to the public free of charge.
 Sun Bay Beach – Located in northern Eilat near the border with Jordan.
 Village Beach – Located in southern Eilat is popular due to their large night time beach parties.

Mediterranean Sea

List of beaches along the Mediterranean Sea:

 Alma Beach – Located along Tel Aviv’s border with Jaffa.
 Aqueduct Beach – Located along the aqueducts used to bring water to the ancient city of Caesarea and is part of the Caesarea Maritima.
 Banana Beach – Located in Tel Aviv is very popular among the younger crowd, and movies are shown free of charge on a large screen on the beach at night.
 Bograshov Beach – Located right off the promenade in the center of Tel Aviv
 Carmel Beach – Located in Haifa is popular especially due to its proximity to the Carmel Beach Railway Station
 Charles Clore Beach – Located in Tel Aviv right next to Charles Clore Park
 Dado South Beach – Sometimes just called South Beach is located in Haifa
 Dor Beach – Located in the town of Dor just 15 minutes from Haifa
 Drummers Beach – Located at the end of the beach strip in Tel Aviv gains its name from the large number of drum circles which can often be found there on Friday afternoons.
 Frishman Beach – Located in Tel Aviv right near the hotels.
 Givat Aliyah Beach – Located in Jaffa is best known for its large rock formations and arches.
 Gordon Beach – Located on Gordon street in Tel Aviv is very popular among tourists due to the proximity to the hotels.
 HaBonim Beach – Located in northern Israel and is popular among those who wish to camp overnight on the beach.
 Hilton Beach – Sometimes called Atzmaut Beach, is located in Tel Aviv is the only beach in the city which allows dogs on the beach, and is very popular among homosexual crowd.
 Metzitzim Beach – Formerly Sheraton Beach located in Tel Aviv
 Nahsholim Beach – Located next to kibbutz Nahsholim in northern Israel.
 Nordau Beach – The only beach in Tel Aviv that caters toward the religious crowd, with different days for men and women.
 Tzuk Beach – Also known as Cliff Beach is located in southern Tel Aviv.
 Jerusalem Beach – Despite the name this beach is located in Tel Aviv.
 Gil's Beach - Located in Ashdod.
Sandy Beach - Located in Ashdod.
Mei Ami Beach - Located in Ashdod.
Lido Beach - Located in Ashdod.
Miami Beach - Located in Ashdod.
Oranim Beach - Located in Ashdod.
Palmahim Beach - Located in Palmahim.
HaKshatot Beach - Located in Ashdod.
Yud-Alef Beach - Located in Ashdod.
Reviera Beach - Located in Ashdod.
Nitzanim Beach – Located south to Ashdod.
 Hasela Beach - Located in Ashkelon.
Hofit Beach - Located in Ashkelon.
Barnea Beach - Located in Ashkelon.
Ha-Gan Beach - Located in Ashkelon.
Bar Kohba Beach - Located in Ashkelon.
Delila Beach - Located in Ashkelon.
Zikim Beach – Located south to Ashkelon.

Dead Sea

List of beaches along the Dead Sea:

Northern basin
For the beaches on the West Bank section of the Dead Sea shore, see List of beaches in Palestine (includes Kalia, Neve Midbar, and Biankini; Mineral Beach is closed indefinitely due to sinkholes).
 Ein Gedi Spa – south of Ein Gedi.

Closed due to sinkholes
 Ein Gedi Beach – near historical Ein Gedi and north of Ein Gedi Spa, abandoned due to sinkholes.

Southern basin resorts
 Ein Bokek beach – near the Ein Bokek shopping center, Israel
 Neve Zohar beach, Israel

Kinneret (Sea of Galilee)

List of beaches along the Kinneret, known in English as the Sea of Galilee:

 Ein Gev Resort Village Beach – Located in the Ein Gev Resort

See also
 List of beaches
 Israel national beach soccer team

References

 
Israel
Beaches
Beaches